Paul A. Lefebvre (born 1974) is a Canadian politician, currently serving as the mayor of Greater Sudbury. He was a Liberal Member of Parliament (MP) for the riding of Sudbury from 2015 to 2021.

Lefebvre worked as a lawyer, spending some time as counsel to the Ontario Human Rights Commission, and teaching international tax law at the University of Ottawa. In his business career, he was the owner of local media firm Le5 Communications, whose holdings included French-language radio and newspapers. He won the Liberal Party's nomination contest in Sudbury on March 28, 2015 over former mayor Marianne Matichuk.

In March 2021, Lefebvre announced that he would not run for a third term in the 2021 Canadian federal election.

He won election as mayor of Greater Sudbury in the 2022 Greater Sudbury municipal election on October 24, 2022, and took office on November 15.

Electoral record

References

External links
 Official Website

Living people
1974 births
Liberal Party of Canada MPs
Members of the House of Commons of Canada from Ontario
Businesspeople from Greater Sudbury
People from Kapuskasing
Franco-Ontarian people
Lawyers in Ontario
Canadian radio executives
University of Ottawa alumni
Academic staff of the University of Ottawa
University of Waterloo alumni
University of Ottawa Faculty of Law alumni
Mayors of Greater Sudbury
21st-century Canadian politicians